Blood Covered Words is an EP by the heavy metal Canadian band, A Perfect Murder.

Track listing
 "Intro"
 "Crucified by Fear"
 "Downfall of the Human Empire"
 "God's Worthless Promises"
 "There Is No Escape"
 "Dig Your Grave"
 "A Perfect Murder"

A Perfect Murder (band) albums
2001 EPs